1820 election can refer to:
1820 French legislative election
1820 United States presidential election
1820 United States House of Representatives elections